The Fish Auction Hall (German: Fischauktionshalle) was built in Altona, today part of Hamburg, Germany, in 1895/96 at the newly constructed fishing port. It is located at 9, Große Elbstraße. From 1982 to 1984 it was fully renovated. Since 1984 it has been a cultural heritage monument, demonstrating the importance of fish trade for the former rival cities of Hamburg and Altona. Today, it is used for events, such as Hafengeburtstag.

References

External links

 

 

Buildings and structures in Altona, Hamburg
Heritage sites in Hamburg
Fishing in Germany
History of auctions